Counsel and Care was formed in 1954 and merged with Independent Age in October 2012. The charities merged to provide a greater range of services to older people in need than either could provide separately.

Charities for the elderly based in the United Kingdom